The Cathedral of St Mary of the Assumption is a Roman Catholic church located in the Spanish city of Ceuta, in a small exclave on the northwest coast of Africa.

A primitive Eastern Roman Christian church stood on the site, and some researchers have identified this with the one built in the 6th century by Emperor Justinian I. This was replaced by the old Great Mosque of Ceuta, an architectural work of enormous wealth, according to descriptions which have survived, and although it underwent several enlargements, hardly any remains of it are to be seen today.

After the Portuguese conquest of 1415, the Great Mosque was transformed into a Christian church by alterations, but there is no record of what they were. The passage of time and damage suffered by warlike incidents caused the ruin of the building, and at the end of the 17th-century it was decided to replace it by a new church designed by the architect Juan de Ochoa. Building work began in 1686, but many difficulties were suffered in the years which followed as a result of a great siege to which Ceuta was subjected, and the new cathedral was not consecrated until 1726, when it was dedicated to the Assumption of Our Lady.

Attached to the cathedral, there is a building housing the vicariate, secretariat, diocesan archive, library, cathedral museum, and other offshoots of the diocese, and there is also the bishop's palace, which surrounds a small triangular courtyard.

Important sights in the cathedral are the Chapel of the Most Holy Trinity, a Baroque altarpiece, and frescoes by Miguel Bernardini, besides three large canvases and a 15th-century figure of the Great Virgin, which is of Portuguese origin.

References

External links
 Cathedral

Churches in Ceuta
Ceuta
Renaissance architecture in Spain
Baroque architecture in Spain
Former mosques in Spain
18th-century Roman Catholic church buildings in Spain
Portuguese colonial architecture in Spain
Neoclassical church buildings in Spain